Grove City is a city in Franklin County, Ohio, United States which was founded in 1852. It is a suburb of Columbus. The population was 	41,252 according to the 2020 Census.

History
Until the mid-19th century, the area that is now Grove City was a wilderness filled with oak, beech, maple, walnut, dogwood and other trees.  The area's first European settler, Hugh Grant, operated a gristmill in Pittsburgh and transported excess goods down the Ohio River for sale, returning to Pittsburgh on foot. On one of these trips, he passed through the Scioto Valley region and in 1803, purchased the land that would become Grove City and returned with his wife Catharine to start a new life.

Grove City's official founder, William F. Breck, bought 15.25 acres of the farm owned by Hugh Grant, Jr., son of the first settler in Jackson Township, then added 300 more acres intended for farming. Breck's original plan changed when he realized the potential for growth since Harrisburg Turnpike passed through the area to the state capital, Columbus. Breck envisioned a new village complete with a school, church, stores, blacksmith and carpenter shops. Breck formed a commission with George Weygandt, William Sibray and Jeremiah Smith and platted the village on the east side of Broadway in 1852.

By December 1853, the newly formed (but not yet incorporated) village of Grove City had 50 residents. The town founders named the village for the remaining groves of trees left standing after their initial clearing.

Geography

Demographics

2010 census
At the 2010 census there were 35,575 people, 13,946 households, and 9,585 families living in the city. The racial makeup of the city was 92.6% White, 2.8% African American, 0.2% Native American, 1.3% Asian, 1.0% from other races, and 2.1% from two or more races. Hispanic or Latino of any race were 2.6%.

Of the 13,946 households 35.3% had children under the age of 18 living with them, 52.2% were married couples living together, 11.8% had a female householder with no husband present, 4.7% had a male householder with no wife present, and 31.3% were non-families. 25.6% of households were one person and 9.7% were one person aged 65 or older. The average household size was 2.53 and the average family size was 3.04.

The median age was 37.8 years. 25.4% of residents were under the age of 18; 8.4% were between the ages of 18 and 24; 27.4% were from 25 to 44; 26.6% were from 45 to 64; and 12.2% were 65 or older. The gender makeup of the city was 48.3% male and 51.7% female.

2000 census
At the 2000 census there were 27,075 people, 10,265 households, and 7,544 families living in the city. The population density was 1,941.2 people per square mile (749.4/km2). There were 10,712 housing units at an average density of 768.0 per square mile (296.5/km2).  The racial makeup of the city was 96.17% White, 1.54% African American, 0.22% Native American, 0.60% Asian, 0.01% Pacific Islander, 0.34% from other races, and 1.11% from two or more races. Hispanic or Latino of any race were 1.17%.

Of the 10,265 households 37.8% had children under the age of 18 living with them, 59.5% were married couples living together, 10.3% had a female householder with no husband present, and 26.5% were non-families. 22.4% of households were one person and 8.3% were one person aged 65 or older. The average household size was 2.61 and the average family size was 3.07.

The age distribution was 28.3% under the age of 18, 7.4% from 18 to 24, 31.6% from 25 to 44, 21.7% from 45 to 64, and 11.1% 65 or older. The median age was 35 years. For every 100 females, there were 94.4 males. For every 100 females age 18 and over, there were 89.8 males.

The median household income was $52,064 and the median family income  was $62,059. Males had a median income of $40,599 versus $30,399 for females. The per capita income for the city was $22,305. About 3.3% of families and 4.6% of the population were below the poverty line, including 5.3% of those under age 18 and 4.8% of those age 65 or over.

Government
Grove City is operated based on a city charter that was originally written in 1958 and later amended in 1982. The charter gives the city's power to an elected Mayor, an elected City Council, and an appointed Administrator. The current mayor of Grove City is Richard L. (Ike) Stage.

It is located in the South-Western City School District.

Grove City is split between Ohio's 3rd and Ohio's 15th congressional district. The city is also split between Ohio's 3rd senatorial district and Ohio's 16th senatorial district and its Ohio State House Districts are OH-17, OH-23, and OH-24.

National Register of Historic Places
Gantz Homestead at 2233 Gantz Road, added in 1979
A.G. Grant Homestead at 4124 Haughn Road, added in 1998

Notable people
 Gary Burley, former professional football player who played for the Cincinnati Bengals in Super Bowl XVI
 Derek Combs, Mr. Football Ohio 1996; NFL player for Oakland Raiders and Green Bay Packers.
 Richard Cordray, former Director of the Consumer Financial Protection Bureau and Democratic nominee for governor of Ohio in 2018.
 Josh Dun, drummer for Twenty One Pilots
 Tyler Joseph, frontman for Twenty One Pilots
 Craig McDonald, author, journalist
 Mike Mayers, Major League Baseball pitcher who debuted for the St. Louis Cardinals
 Pat O'Conner, Minor League Baseball executive
 Ben Swanson, professional soccer player for Columbus Crew

Sister city
 Lübtheen, Germany

Gallery

See also
Beulah Park Racetrack
Central Crossing High School
Grove City High School
Scioto Grove Metro Park

References

External links
 City website
 Grove City Town Center Inc.
 Grove City Visitors Bureau
 Grove City Chamber of Commerce
 

Cities in Ohio
Cities in Franklin County, Ohio
Populated places established in 1852
1852 establishments in Ohio